This is a list of vocal trance artists and vocalists.

Artists 

4 Strings
Above & Beyond
Airbase

Alice Deejay
Aly & Fila
Andy Moor
Armin Van Buuren
Ashley Wallbridge
Astroline
ATB
Binary Finary
Blank & Jones
Bryan Kearney
BT
Cascada
Chicane
Cosmic Gate
Darren Tate
Tomcraft
Dash Berlin
Dee Dee
Delerium
Denis Kenzo
DHT
DJ Encore
DJ Sammy
DT8 Project
Edward Maya
Elucidate
Example
Faithless
Ferry Corsten
Filo & Peri
Flip & Fill
Fragma
Gabriel & Dresden
Gareth Emery
Giuseppe Ottaviani
Gouryella
Ian Van Dahl
Infernal
Jam & Spoon
JES
Jessy De Smet
John O'Callaghan
Judge Jules
Kate Ryan
Kelly Llorenna
Kyau & Albert
Lasgo
Lost Witness
Markus Schulz
Mauro Picotto
Mayumi Morinaga
Milk Inc.
Move
N-Trance
OceanLab
one¹
Paul Oakenfold
Paul Van Dyk
Paul Vinitsky
PPK
Protoculture
RAM
Robert Miles
Roger Shah
Ronski Speed
Sander Van Doorn
Sasha
Sophie Sugar
Sean Tyas
Sebastian Brandt
Super8 & Tab
Sylver
The Space Brothers
TranceCrafter
Tiësto
Tritonal
(We Are) Nexus

Vocalists 

Alexandra Prince
Andrea Britton
Anita Kelsey
Annemie Coenen
Aruna
Audrey Gallagher
Basshunter
Betsie Larkin
Bo Bruce
Cara Dillon
Christian Burns
Chris Jones
Christina Novelli
Damae Klein
Dhany
Ellie Lawson
Emma Hewitt
Evi Goffin
Gaia
Haliene
Jan Burton
Jan Johnston
Jaren
Jes Brieden
Jessica Wahls
Jeza
Jonathan Mendelsohn
Judith Pronk
Justine Suissa
Kelly Llorenna
Kirsty Hawkshaw
Kristy Thirsk
Linda Mertens
Linney
Lucy Saunders
Mavie Marcos
Medina
Nadia Ali
Natalie Gioia
Natalie Horler
Plumb (singer)
Richard Bedford
Roberta Carter-Harrison
Roxanne Emery
Samantha James
Sarah Howells
Sharon Den Adel
Silvy De Bie
Susana
Tiff Lacey
Tina Cousins
Verena Rehm
Xan Tyler
Yuri
Zoe Johnston

Vocal Trance

Airwave